Stigmella eberhardi is a moth of the family Nepticulidae. It is widespread in the Mediterranean region, north to southern central Europe. It has been recorded from the Czech Republic and Slovakia, Austria, Hungary, south-eastern France, Spain, Portugal, Italy, Sardinia, Slovenia, Croatia, Macedonia, Greece and Turkey.

The wingspan is 4.9-6.8 mm. Adults are on wing from April to September. There are two generations per year.

The larvae feed on Quercus ilex, Quercus petraea, Quercus pubescens, Quercus pyrenaica, Quercus robur and Quercus suber. They mine the leaves of their host plant. The mine consists of a slender corridor with a narrow frass line. The mine cannot be distinguished from the mines of Stigmella roborella and Stigmella atricapitella.

External links
Fauna Europaea
bladmineerders.nl
The Quercus Feeding Stigmella Species Of The West Palaearctic: New Species, Key And Distribution (Lepidoptera: Nepticulidae)

Nepticulidae
Moths of Europe
Moths of Asia
Moths described in 1971